Temnora inornatum is a moth of the family Sphingidae. It is known from South Africa.

The length of the forewings is about 26 mm. It is similar to Temnora nitida, but the broad oblique band on the forewing upperside is narrowed and angled. The forewing upperside has an oblique brown band. The hindwing upperside has a marginal band intermediate in intensity and definition between those of Temnora murina and Temnora nitida.

References

Endemic moths of South Africa
Temnora
Moths described in 1894
Moths of Africa